In military terms, 73rd Division or 73rd Infantry Division may refer to:

 73rd Infantry Division (Wehrmacht)
 73rd Rifle Division (Soviet Union)
 73rd Guards Rifle Division
 73rd Division (United Kingdom)